In Slavic Native Faith (Rodnovery) there are a number of shared holidays throughout the year, when important ritual activities are set according to shared calendars. Generally speaking, ritual activities may be distinguished into "external" (exoteric) and "internal" (esoteric) relatively to the different communities. External ceremonies are mass gatherings, usually held on important holidays dedicated to the worship of common gods, and involving large numbers of people. Internal ceremonies are those restricted to specific groups, and holding special meaning for such groups; they may comprise private rituals and worship of specific ancestors.

Calendars of holidays

Ivanits and Rybakov's calendar of holidays
Linda J. Ivanits reconstructs a basic calendar of the  East Slavs' celebrations of Slavic gods, based on Boris Rybakov's studies of ancient agricultural calendars, especially a fourth-century calendar found in the Kyiv region.

General Russian Rodnover calendar of holidays
According to the Rodnover questions–answers compendium Izvednik (Изведник), almost all Russian Rodnovers rely upon the Gregorian calendar and celebrate the "sunny holidays" (highlighted in yellow in the table herebelow), with the addition of holidays dedicated to Perun, Mokosh and Veles (green herebelow), the Red Hill ancestral holiday (orange herebelow), and five further holidays dedicated to ancestors (including Вешние Деды, "Spring Forefathers"; Трояцкие Деды, "Whitsun Forefathers"; Дмитровские Деды, "Demetrius Forefathers"; and Рождественские Деды, "Christmas Forefathers", etc.). The contemporary Rodnover calendar is structured as follows:

Calendars of months

Names of months in local Slavic traditions

In some Slavic languages, such as Russian, the modern names of the months are borrowings from Latin. Otherwise, local traditions and other Slavic languages have preserved Slavic endonyms (endogenous names) for months. Volkhv Aleksey Aleksandrovich Dobroslav has proposed a standardised nomenclature, as reported in the table herebelow. Many Slavic months' names refer to natural phenomena, things and human crafts (for instance, Traven means "Grass"; Bulgarian Sukh means "Dry", etc.).

See also
 Festival of Veles
 Slavic Native Faith
 Slavic calendar
 Wheel of the Year
 Heathen holidays

Sources

Citations

References
 
 

Slavic neopaganism
Modern pagan holidays

Lists of observances